The Gun Hawk is a 1963 American Western film directed by Edward Ludwig and starring Rory Calhoun, Rod Cameron, Ruta Lee and Rod Lauren.

Plot 
Gunslinger Rory Calhoun dispenses his own brand of justice in this action-packed Western adventure co-starring Rod Cameron and Ruta Lee. It has been three years since gunfighter Blaine Madden (Calhoun) visited his hometown. So when he warns the Sully brothers to stop harassing the town drunk, they shoot the old man dead, not realizing he’s Madden’s father. Killing them both, Madden is badly wounded by the sheriff (Cameron) but escapes to an outlaw haven where the law fears to tread and prepares what may be his last stand.

Conception and production
Written by Jo Heims (known later for Play Misty for Me), The Gun Hawk was the final film directed by Edward Ludwig, whose nearly 50-year career spanned over 100 shorts, television episodes and features, including the John Wayne hits The Fighting Seabees, Wake of the Red Witch and Big Jim McLain.

Cast
 Rory Calhoun as Blaine Madden
 Rod Cameron as Sheriff Ben Corey
 Ruta Lee as Marleen
 Rod Lauren as 'Reb' Roan
 Morgan Woodward as Deputy 'Mitch' Mitchell 
 Robert J. Wilke as Johnny Flanders
 John Litel as Drunk - Madden's father 
 Jody Daniels as Tommy
 Rod Whelan as Blackjack
 Rodolfo Hoyos Jr. as Miguel (as Rodolfo Hoyos)
 Lane Bradford as Joe Sully
 Natividad Vacío as Quid (as Natividad Vacio)
 Joan Connors as Roan's Woman
 Glenn Stensel as Luke Sully
 Gregg Barton as Henchman 
 Frank Gardner as Henchman
 Harry Fleer as Curly
 Lee Bradley as Pancho

References

External links

1963 Western (genre) films
1963 films
Allied Artists films
American Western (genre) films
Films directed by Edward Ludwig
Films with screenplays by Jo Heims
1960s English-language films
1960s American films